I've Been Around may refer to:
 I've Been Around (film), a 1935 American film
 I've Been Around (album), the 2006 release from Ben E. King
 I've Been Around (song), a song written and performed by Fats Domino